Camp Warehouse was a International Security Assistance Force (ISAF) during the War in Afghanistan (2001–2021). It was located 10 km east of Kabul, Kabul Province in Afghanistan. Initially constructed by German soldiers, Camp Warehouse was a major coordination centre for ISAF, hosting detachments from multiple countries. The base was used to co-ordinate multi-national forces in and around Kabul hosting equipment from a large number of countries in the multi-national force, as well as maintaining an ISAF Signal Operations Centre used for managing ISAF air sorties and patrols.

Camp Warehouse was additionally the site of the German built Camp Warehouse Field Hospital, run by the Multinational Medical Task Force. The hospital operated on more than 600 Afghan men, women and children.

History
The facility was largely abandoned following the drawdown of ISAF forces in 2014. Following the Fall of Kabul to the Taliban in 2021, the status of Camp Warehouse is unknown, but is presumed to be abandoned.

Garrison information

Former occupants 

 Austria
 Canada
 Croatia
 Netherlands
 France
 Germany
 Georgia
 Hungary

Current use 
The current use of Camp Warehouse is unknown following the capture of Kabul by Taliban forces. However, no foreign presence remains garrisoned at the camp.

Legacy 
A memorial to 26 German and other coalition soldiers killed as part of commitments to ISAF from 2002 to 2007 was initially located at Camp Warehouse. In November 2014, this memorial was moved to the "Forest of remembrance", located at the German Joint Forces Command in the vicinity of Potsdam.

References

External links 
 Photo of Camp Warehouse
 Camp Warehouse in Google Earth

War in Afghanistan (2001–2021)
Military installations of Afghanistan
Military installations of Canada
Afghanistan
Afghanistan–Germany military relations
Afghanistan–Canada military relations
Overseas or abroad military installations